Emirdağ YHT station, short for Emirdağ Yüksek Hızlı Tren station, is a railway station located north of Emirdağ, Turkey, that is planned to be constructed soon. The station will be located just east of the D.675 highway near the village of Karağaç, and will service high-speed trains along the Polatlı–Izmir high-speed railway.

The station will become the first railway station in Emirdağ once opened.

References

External links 
 Ankara-İzmir high-speed railway project

Railway stations in Afyonkarahisar Province
Buildings and structures in Afyonkarahisar Province
High-speed railway stations in Turkey
Railway stations under construction in Turkey
Transport in Afyonkarahisar Province